Phlapphla Chai is a district (amphoe) of Buriram province, northeastern Thailand.

Geography
Neighbouring districts are (from the south clockwise) Prakhon Chai, Mueang Buriram, Krasang of Buriram Province and Prasat of Surin province.

History
The minor district (king amphoe) was created on 1 April 1989, when five tambons were split off from Prakhon Chai district. It was upgraded to a full district on 4 July 1994.

Administration
The district is divided into five sub-districts (tambons), which are further subdivided into 67 villages (mubans). Phlapphla Chai is a township (thesaban tambon) which covers parts of tambon Sadao. There are also five tambon administrative organizations (TAO).

References

External links
amphoe.com

Phlapphla Chai